Geoffry Claude "Geof" Kotila is an American basketball coach. He played college basketball for Michigan Tech before going into coaching.

Playing career
Kotila played high school basketball at Glen Lake School in Maple City, Michigan, before enrolling at Michigan Technological University. He was a four-year starter for the Huskies, earning the team's outstanding newcomer honors in 1978-79, garnering the team’s most improved player award in 1980-81 as well as team MVP honors and the Raymond L. Smith Award as the university's outstanding senior male student-athlete in the 1981-82 campaign. Kotila scored 1,394 points in 102 games for MTU. He ranked third all-time in career points, when his playing career at Michigan Tech came to an end in 1982.

Coaching career
In 1985-86, Kotila served as head men's cross country coach at Michigan Tech and was an assistant men's basketball coach between 1985 and 1987, before being appointed as MTU head men's basketball coach. He stayed on the job until 1994 and had a record of 82 wins and 120 losses. He went to Denmark, where he coached in the pro ranks. From 1995 to 2002, Kotila served as head coach of Horsens IC in the country’s top division Basketliga, leading the team to a Danish national championship title in 1998 and a Danish cup title in 1996. During his four-year stint at Skovbakken Bears (2002-2006), Kotila won the Danish championship in 2004 and 2005, and the Danish Cup in 2005. In the 2004-05 season, he was recognized with Danish Basketliga Coach of the Year honors. He also coached the Bears in their first ever appearance in the EuroCup.

In May 2006, Kotila signed a two-year deal with Snæfell of the Icelandic Úrvalsdeild karla. During his first season, the team ended with the third best record in the league before a 76–74 overtime loss in game five in its best-of-five semi-finals series against KR in the Úrvalsdeild playoffs brought the season to a close. In the 2007–08 season, he led Snæfell to winning the Icelandic Cup and to the runner-up spot in league play.

He left the team afterwards, returning to Denmark, where he was named head coach of Team Fog Næstved in June 2008. In his five-year stint at Næstved, Kotila was named Basketliga Coach of the Year in the 2010-11 season and guided the team to a third-place finish in the national championship in the 2011–12 campaign, which was the best result in club history. Following the conclusion of the 2012–13 season, Kotila decided to step down as Næstved head coach. Besides his job as head coach in the pro ranks, Kotila has also been working alongside Craig Pedersen as basketball coach and English teacher at EVN (Efterskolen ved Nyborg) school in Nyborg, Denmark since 2008.

In 2017, he took over the job as commissioner of Denmark’s top flight Basketliga.

References

External links
Profile at Eurobasket.com

Living people
American expatriate basketball people in Denmark
Basketball people from Michigan
Michigan Tech Huskies men's basketball players
Michigan Tech Huskies men's basketball coaches
Year of birth missing (living people)